Choeradodis is a genus of praying mantises with common names such as shield mantis, hood mantis (or hooded mantis), and leaf mantis (or leafy mantis) because of their extended, leaf-like thoraces.  The distinguishing characteristic of Choreododis from which it takes its common names is a laterally expanded thorax. This adaptation for the purpose of camouflage, as well as a rounded wing case and a habit of staying relatively flattened, aid its leaf mimicry.

Distribution
Choeradodis is widely distributed. In the Americas, members of this genus are found in the Neotropical realm from South America to Mexico. In Asia, members of this genus dwell in the same climate zone of India.

Species
The following species are recognised in the genus Choeradodis:
Choeradodis columbica (Columbian shield mantis )
Choeradodis rhombicollis (Peruvian shield mantis )
Choeradodis rhomboidea (tropical shield mantis, hooded mantis, leaf mantis 
Choeradodis stalii (tropical shield mantis, hooded mantis, leaf mantis )
Choeradodis strumaria (leaf mantis, hooded mantis )

See also

List of mantis genera and species
Leaf mantis
Shield mantis

References

Mantidae
Mantodea genera
Mantodea of North America
Mantodea of South America